Dănuţ Marcu (born 11 January 1952) is a Romanian mathematician and computer scientist, who received his Ph.D. from the University of Bucharest in 1981. He claimed to have authored more than 400 scientific papers.

Marcu was frequently accused of plagiarism.
The editors of Studia Universitatis Babeş-Bolyai, Informatica decided to ban Marcu from their journal for this reason, as did the editors of 4OR and the editors of Geombinatorics. The editors of  Geometriae Dedicata state that they suspect Marcu of plagiarism, as he submitted a manuscript which is "more-or-less word for word the same" as a paper by Bernt Lindström. Jerrold W. Grossman, Sanpei Kageyama, Martin R. Pettet, and anonymous reviewers have accused Marcu of plagiarism in MathSciNet reviews. According to the managing editors of Menemui Matematik, Marcu's paper in that journal is a well known result in graph theory, and the paper "should not have been published".

See also 
 List of scientific misconduct incidents

References

External links
 

Living people
1952 births
20th-century Romanian mathematicians
21st-century Romanian  mathematicians
Scientists from Bucharest
People involved in plagiarism controversies
People involved in scientific misconduct incidents
University of Bucharest alumni